This is a list of places of interest in the ceremonial county of Hampshire, England. See List of places in Hampshire for a list of settlements in the county.

Places of interest

 Aldershot Military Museum
 Beaulieu Abbey and the National Motor Museum
 Beacon Hill, Burghclere, Hampshire
 Broadlands
 The D-Day Story
 Exbury Gardens & House 
 Farnborough Air Sciences Museum
 Farnborough Airshow
 Fleet Pond
 Highclere Castle
 HMS Victory
 Itchen Valley Country Park 
 Jane Austen's House Museum 
 Lakeside Country Park 
 Lepe Country Park 
 Manor Farm Country Park 
 Marwell Wildlife 
 Mary Rose
 Mid-Hants Watercress Railway 
 Mottisfont Abbey 
 Netley Abbey 
 New Forest 
 New Forest Museum
 River Avon
 River Hamble
 River Itchen
 Portchester Castle 
 Portsdown Hill
 Portsmouth Historic Dockyard inc. the Royal Naval Museum and historic ships
 Queen Elizabeth Country Park 
 River Meon
 River Test
 Romsey Abbey
 Royal Armouries Museum (Fort Nelson)
 Royal Victoria Country Park 
 Silchester Roman Town
 Southampton Water
 South Downs Way, a long distance footpath
 Southsea Castle
 Spinnaker Tower
 Staunton Country Park 
 Stratfield Saye House
 St Michael's Abbey 
 The Vyne 
 Wellington Country Park 
 Whitchurch Silk Mill
 Winchester Cathedral
 Winchester City Mill

See also
List of Grade I listed buildings in Hampshire

 
Hampshire